Parapsilorhynchus discophorus, commonly known as the Ratnagiri minnow, is indigenous to India.

References

Cyprinid fish of Asia
Freshwater fish of India
Taxa named by Sunder Lal Hora
Fish described in 1921